Naji El-Mekki (born 25 December 1934) is a Moroccan modern pentathlete and sports shooter. He competed at the 1960 Summer Olympics.

References

1934 births
Living people
Moroccan male modern pentathletes
Moroccan male sport shooters
Olympic modern pentathletes of Morocco
Olympic shooters of Morocco
Modern pentathletes at the 1960 Summer Olympics
Shooters at the 1960 Summer Olympics
People from El Jadida